Čutura is a South Slavic surname literally meaning "canteen". Notable people with the surname include:

 Dalibor Čutura (born 1975), Serbian handball player and coach
Mario Čutura (born 1978), Croatian footballer
 Zoran Čutura (born 1962), Croatian basketball player

See also
 
 Čuturilo
Čotra (same literal meaning, in Turkish)

South Slavic-language surnames
Croatian surnames